Liparis fissipetala is a species of orchid native to southern China (Chongqing and Yunnan). It has also been considered to be the sole species in the genus Ypsilorchis.

References

Orchids of China
fissipetala